The Bastide de Repentance is a historic bastide in Aix-en-Provence, France.

History
The bastide was built from 1657 to 1660.

Architectural significance
It has been listed as an official historical monument by the French Ministry of Culture since 1984.

References

Houses completed in 1660
Monuments historiques of Aix-en-Provence
1660 establishments in France